The Dutch Eredivisie in the 2001–02 season was contested by 18 teams. Ajax won the championship.

League standings

Results

Promotion/relegation play-offs

See also
 2001–02 Eerste Divisie
 2001–02 KNVB Cup

References

 Eredivisie official website - info on all seasons 
 RSSSF

Eredivisie seasons
Netherlands
1